Baiturrahim Mosque is a mosque located in Ulee Lheue, Meuraksa sub-district, Aceh Province, Indonesia. As a legacy of the sultan of Aceh in the 17th century, it is one of the historical mosques in Indonesia. Previously, the mosque was named Jami Ulee Lheu Mosque. In 1873, when the Baiturrahman Grand Mosque was burned by the Dutch, all the worshipers held a Friday prayer at Ulee Lheue. Since then the name of the mosque became Baiturrahim Mosque.

Since its establishment, the mosque has been restored several times. Initially the building was completely made out of wood, with a simple shape and was located next to the location of the present mosque. Because it was made out of wood, the building did not last long as weathering had torn the building down. In 1922 the mosque was re-built with long-lasting material by the government of the Dutch East Indies with European architectural style. However, this construction did not use iron or bone braces, and the building was built with bricks and cement only.

In 1983, Banda Aceh was rocked by a devastating earthquake, and it undermined the dome of the mosque. After that people rebuilt the mosque but they no longer installed the dome, thus replacing it with an ordinary roof. Ten years later, a massive renovation of the mosque was commenced, leaving the front part the only original part of the building. Sixty percent of the remaining parts were renovated. Until today, the original part of the mosque still looks solid on the front.

On December 26, 2004, an earthquake and subsequent tsunami leveled the entire buildings around the mosque, making Baiturrahim Mosque the only surviving structure in the area. The condition of the part of the mosque made of bricks was only damaged about twenty percent, and the people of Aceh highly honored this mosque as a symbol of God's greatness.

See also 
 Islam in Indonesia
 List of mosques in Indonesia
 Floating Mosque of Palu, another mosque that partially survived a tsunami

References 

Mosques in Aceh
Buildings and structures in Banda Aceh
Cultural Properties of Indonesia in Aceh
Indo-Saracenic Revival architecture
Tourist attractions in Aceh
Mosques completed in 1922